International Rescue may refer to:
International Rescue Committee, an international humanitarian and development organisation
International Rescue Corps, a UK-based rescue organisation
A fictional rescue organization seen in Thunderbirds (TV series)
The original name of UK indie band the June Brides
"International Rescue", a 1989 song by Fuzzbox from the album Big Bang!